In the mathematical field of differential geometry, a biharmonic map is a map between Riemannian or pseudo-Riemannian manifolds which satisfies a certain fourth-order partial differential equation. A biharmonic submanifold refers to an embedding or immersion into a Riemannian or pseudo-Riemannian manifold which is a biharmonic map when the domain is equipped with its induced metric. The problem of understanding biharmonic maps was posed by James Eells and Luc Lemaire in 1983. The study of harmonic maps, of which the study of biharmonic maps is an outgrowth (any harmonic map is also a biharmonic map), had been (and remains) an active field of study for the previous twenty years. A simple case of biharmonic maps is given by biharmonic functions.

Definition

In other words, the above equation is an equality of sections of the vector bundle .

In terms of the trace, interior product, and pullback operations, the biharmonic map equation can be written as

in which the Einstein summation convention is used with the following definitions of the Christoffel symbols, Riemann curvature tensor, and tension field:

It is clear from any of these presentations of the equation that any harmonic map is automatically biharmonic. For this reason, a proper biharmonic map refers to a biharmonic map which is not harmonic.

In the special setting where  is a (pseudo-)Riemannian immersion, meaning that it is an immersion and that  is equal to the induced metric , one says that one has a biharmonic submanifold instead of a biharmonic map. In particular, any minimal immersion is automatically a biharmonic submanifold. A proper biharmonic submanifold refers to a biharmonic submanifold which is not minimal.

The motivation for the biharmonic map equation is from the bienergy functional
 
Eells & Lemaire, in 1983, suggested the study of critical points of this functional. Guo Ying Jiang, in 1986, calculated its first variation formula, thereby finding the above biharmonic map equation as the corresponding Euler-Lagrange equation. Harmonic maps correspond to critical points for which the bienergy functional takes on its minimal possible value of zero.

Examples and classification
A number of examples of biharmonic maps, such as inverses of stereographic projections in the special case of four dimensions, and inversions of punctured Euclidean space, are known. There are many examples of biharmonic submanifolds, such as (for any ) the generalized Clifford torus

as a submanifold of the -sphere.

The biharmonic curves in three-dimensional space forms can be studied via the Frenet equations. It follows easily that every constant-speed biharmonic curve in a three-dimensional space form of nonpositive curvature must be geodesic. Any constant-speed biharmonic curves in the round three-dimensional sphere  can be viewed as the solution of a certain constant-coefficient fourth-order linear ordinary differential equation for a -valued function. As such the situation can be completely analyzed, with the result that any such curve is, up to an isometry of the sphere:
 a constant-speed reparametrization of

In particular, every constant-speed biharmonic curve in  has constant geodesic curvature.

As a consequence of the purely local study of the Gauss-Codazzi equations and the biharmonic map equation, any connected biharmonic surface in  must have constant mean curvature. Surfaces with such strong geometric conditions can be completely classified, with the result that any connected biharmonic surface in  must be either locally (up to isometry) part of the hypersphere

or minimal. In a similar way, any biharmonic hypersurface of Euclidean space which has constant mean curvature must be minimal.

As a special case of Jiang's result, a closed submanifold of a Riemannian manifold of nonpositive sectional curvature is biharmonic if and only if it is minimal. Partly based on these results, it was conjectured that every biharmonic submanifold of a Riemannian manifold of nonpositive sectional curvature must be minimal. This, however, is now known to be false. The special case of submanifolds of Euclidean space is an older conjecture of Bang-Yen Chen. Chen's conjecture has been proven in a number of geometrically special cases.

References

Footnotes

Books and surveys

Articles

Riemannian geometry